Luis Miguel has received multiple awards and nominations. These are some of the awards he has won.

Grammy Awards 

The Grammy Awards are awarded annually by the National Academy of Recording Arts and Sciences of the United States. Luis Miguel received six awards from fifteen nominations.

Latin Grammy Awards 

The Latin Grammy Awards are awarded annually by The Latin Academy of Recording Arts & Sciences of the United States. Miguel received six awards from ten nominations

World Music Awards 

The World Music Awards is an international award show founded in 1989 under the high patronage of Albert II, Prince of Monaco. Awards are presented to the world's best-selling artists in the various categories and to the best-selling artists from each major territory. Sales figures are provided by the International Federation of the Phonographic Industry (IFPI).  Miguel received three awards.

|-
| 1990
| rowspan="4" | Himself
| rowspan="4" | Best Selling Latin Artist
|
|-
| 1995
|
|-
| 1998
|
|-
| 2008
|
|}

American Music Awards 

The American Music Awards (AMAs) is an annual American music awards show, created by Dick Clark in 1973 for ABC when the network's contract to air the Grammy Awards expired.  It is the first of the Big Three music award shows held annually (the others being the Grammy Awards and the Billboard Music Awards) in the United States

|-
| 1998
| rowspan="3" | Himself
| rowspan="3" | Favorite Latin Artist
| 
|-
| 2003
| 
|-
| 2005
| 
|}

Latin American Music Awards 

The Latin American Music Awards (Latin AMAs) is an annual American music award that is presented by Telemundo. It is the Spanish-language counterpart of the American Music Awards (AMAs) produced by the Dick Clark Productions.

|-
| 2018
| Himself
| Favorite Tour
| 
|-
| 2019
| Himself
| Favorite Tour
| 
|}

Billboard Latin Music Awards 

The Billboard Latin Music Awards grew out of the Billboard Music Awards program from Billboard magazine, an industry publication charting the sales and radio airplay success of musical recordings. The Billboard awards are the Latin music industry's longest running award. The award ceremonies are held during the same week of the Billboard Latin Music Conference. The first award ceremony began in 1994.

|-
| rowspan="2" | 1994
| Aries
| Pop album of the year
| 
|-
| Himself
| Pop artist of the year, male
| 
|-
| rowspan="1" | 1995
| Segundo Romance
| Pop album of the year, male
| 
|-
| rowspan="2" | 1998
| Romances
| Pop album of the year, male
| 
|-
| Himself
| Billboard Latin 50 artist of the year
| 
|-
| rowspan="1" | 2000
| Amarte Es un Placer
| Pop album of the year, male
| 
|-
| rowspan="1" | 2001
| Vivo
| Pop album of the year, male
| 
|-
| rowspan="1" | 2002
| Mis Romances
| Pop album of the year, male
| 
|-
| rowspan="1" | 2003
| Himself
| Latin tour of the year
| 
|-
| rowspan="1" | 2004
| Himself
| Latin tour of the year
| 
|-
| rowspan="1" | 2005
| México en la Piel
| Regional Mexican album of the year, male
| 
|-
| rowspan="1" | 2006
| Himself
| Latin tour of the year
| 
|-
| rowspan="2"| 2007
| Navidades
| Pop album of the year, male
| 
|-
| Himself
| Latin tour of the year
| 
|-
| rowspan="2"| 2009
| Cómplices
| Pop album of the year, male
| 
|-
| Himself
| Latin tour of the year
| 
|-
| rowspan="1" | 2012
| Himself
| Latin tour of the year
| 
|-
| rowspan="1" | 2014
| Himself
| Latin tour of the year
| 
|-
| rowspan="1" | 2019
| Himself
| Latin tour of the year
| 
|}

Lo Nuestro Awards 

The Lo Nuestro Awards or Premios Lo Nuestro (Spanish for "Our Thing") is a Spanish-language awards show honoring the best of Latin music, presented by Univision, a Spanish-language television network based in the United States. The awards began in 1989.

|-
| rowspan="2" | 1990
| La Incondicional
| Pop Song of the Year
| 
|-
| rowspan="2"| Himself
| rowspan="2"| Pop Male Artist of the Year
| 
|-
| rowspan="3" | 1991
| 
|-
| 20 Años
| Pop Album of the Year
| 
|-
| Tengo Todo Excepto a Ti
| Pop Song of the Year
| 
|-
| 1992
| Himself
| Pop Male Artist of the Year
| 
|-
| rowspan="4"| 1993
| No Sé Tú
| Pop Song of the Year
| 
|-
| Romance
| Pop Album of the Year
| 
|-
| Himself
| Pop Male Artist of the Year
| 
|-
| América, América
|Video of the Year
| 
|-
| rowspan="5"| 1994
| Himself
| Pop Male Artist of the Year
| 
|-
| Aries
| Pop Album of the Year
| 
|-
| Hasta Que Me Olvides
| rowspan="2"| Pop Song of the Year
| 
|-
| rowspan="2"| Ayer
| 
|-
| Video of the Year
| 
|-
| rowspan="4"| 1995
| Himself
| Pop Male Artist of the Year
| 
|-
| Segundo Romance
| Pop Album of the Year
| 
|-
| La Media Vuelta
|Video of the Year
| 
|-
| El Día Que Me Quieras
| Pop Song of the Year
| 
|-
| rowspan="3"| 1996
| Himself
| Pop Male Artist of the Year
| 
|-
| El Concierto
| Pop Album of the Year
| 
|-
| Si Nos Dejan
| Pop Song of the Year
| 
|-
| rowspan="3"| 1997
| Himself
| Pop Male Artist of the Year
| 
|-
| Nada Es Igual
| Pop Album of the Year
| 
|-
| Dame
| Video of the Year
| 
|-
| rowspan="2"| 1998
| Himself
| Pop Male Artist of the Year
| 
|-
| Por Debajo de la Mesa
| Pop Song of the Year
| 
|-
| 2000
| Amarte Es Un Placer
| rowspan="2"| Pop Album of the Year
| 
|-
| rowspan="3"| 2001
| Vivo
| 
|-
| Himself
| Pop Male Artist of the Year
| 
|-
| Amarte Es Un Placer
| Pop Song of the Year
| 
|-
| rowspan="2"| 2003
| rowspan="2"| Himself
| Excellence Award
| 
|-
| Pop Male Artist of the Year
| 
|-
| rowspan="3"| 2006
| rowspan="2"| Himself
| Ranchero Artist of the Year
| 
|-
| Regional Mexican Male Artist
| 
|-
| Que Seas Feliz
| Video of the Year
| 
|-
| 2019
| Himself
| Tour of the Year
| 
|-
| 2020
| Himself
| Pop/Ballad Artist of the Year
| 
|}

MTV Video Music Award 

MTV Video Music Award (commonly abbreviated as a VMA) is an award presented by the cable channel MTV to honor the best in the music video medium. Originally conceived as an alternative to the Grammy Awards (in the video category), the annual MTV Video Music Awards ceremony has often been called the "Super Bowl for youth", an acknowledgment of the VMA ceremony's ability to draw millions of youth from teens to 20-somethings each year.

|-
| 1993
| América, América
| MTV Internacional
| 
|}

Premios Juventud 

Premios Juventud (Youth Awards) is an awards show for Spanish-speaking celebrities in the areas of film, music, sports, fashion, and pop culture, presented by the television network Univision. Winners are determined by online vote at univision.com.

|-
| rowspan="11"| 2004
| He's Got Style (Luis Miguel)
| rowspan="11"| 2004 Premios Juventud
| 
|-
| He's So Hot! (Luis Miguel)
| 
|-
| What A Actor! (Luis Miguel)
| 
|-
| All Over The Dial (Luis Miguel)
| 
|-
| Catchiest Tune ("Por Debajo de la Mesa")
| 
|-
| I Die Without That CD ("33")
| 
|-
| I Die Without That CD ("Romances")
| 
|-
| My Idol Is (Luis Miguel)
| 
|-
| Hottest Romance (Luis Miguel and Myrka Dellanos)
| 
|-
| Paparazzi's Favorite Target (Luis Miguel and Myrka Dellanos)
| 
|-
| Paparazzi's Favorite Target (Luis Miguel)
| 
|-
| rowspan="2"| 2005
| Hottest Romance (Luis Miguel and Aracely Arámbula)
| rowspan="2"| 2005 Premios Juventud
| 
|-
| Paparazzi's Favorite Target (Luis Miguel)
| 
|-
| rowspan="2"| 2006
| Hottest Romance (Luis Miguel and Aracely Arámbula)
| rowspan="2"| 2006 Premios Juventud
| 
|-
| Paparazzi's Favorite Target (Luis Miguel)
| 
|-
| rowspan="1"| 2007
| Paparazzi's Favorite Target (Luis Miguel)
| rowspan="1"| 2007 Premios Juventud
| 
|-
| rowspan="2"| 2008
| Hottest Romance (Luis Miguel and Aracely Arámbula)
| rowspan="2"| 2008 Premios Juventud
| 
|-
| Paparazzi's Favorite Target (Luis Miguel)
| 
|-
| rowspan="1"| 2009
| Paparazzi's Favorite Target (Luis Miguel)
| rowspan="1"| 2009 Premios Juventud
| 
|-
| rowspan="1"| 2010
| Paparazzi's Favorite Target (Luis Miguel)
| rowspan="1"| 2010 Premios Juventud
| 
|-
| rowspan="1"| 2011
| Best Novelist Theme ("Tres Palabras")
| rowspan="1"| 2011 Premios Juventud
| 
|}

References

External links
 Official website

Miguel, Luis
Awards